Trichopodini (or Gymnosomatini) is a tribe of flies in the family Tachinidae.

Genera
Acaulona van der Wulp, 1884
Trichopoda Berthold, 1827
Xanthomelanopsis Townsend, 1917

References

Diptera of North America
Diptera of South America
Phasiinae
Brachycera tribes